The 1943–44 Palestine Youth League was the second season since its introduction in 1941–42. 

Although league matches weren't completed, the EIFA declared Maccabi Michael Tel Aviv as champions, as no other team could overtake them.

Final table

References

Israeli Noar Premier League seasons
Youth